The 2015 Red Bull Global RallyCross Championship was the fifth season of the Global RallyCross Championship. Joni Wiman was the reigning champion in the Supercars class and drove for the same team, Olsbergs MSE. 2014 GRC Lites runner-up Sebastian Eriksson stepped up to the GRC.

Schedule
 A seven-round provisional calendar was revealed on January 13, 2015.

Entries

Supercars

GRC Lites

All competitors drove an Olsbergs MSE-built GRC Lites car.

Results and standings

Events

Drivers' championships
Points are awarded to event finishers using the following structure:

In addition, points are awarded in the second and third rounds of heats. First place earns three points, second place earns two points, and all other drivers to start the heat earn one point.

Supercars

Notes:
† — Non-championship round

GRC Lites

Manufacturers' championship
No Manufacturers' championship in GRC Lites class

References

External links
 

GRC Rallycross
Global RallyCross